is a Japanese politician who served as Minister for Internal Affairs and Communications from October 2021 to August 2022. He is serving in the House of Representatives as a member of the Liberal Democratic Party.

Career
A native of Kuma District, Kumamoto and graduate of Waseda University, Kaneko was elected for the first time in 2000 as an independent. He later joined the LDP.

His profile on the LDP website:
Secretary to a Diet Member
Parliamentary Secretary for Agriculture, Forestry and Fisheries (Koizumi Cabinet)
Senior Vice-Minister of Land, Infrastructure and Transport (Fukuda and Aso Cabinet)
Deputy Chairman, Policy Research Council of LDP
Director, Youth Division of LDP
Chairman, Committee on Land, Infrastructure, Transport and Tourism

Positions
Kaneko is affiliated to the openly revisionist lobby Nippon Kaigi, and a member of the following right-wing groups at the Diet:
Nippon Kaigi Diet discussion group (日本会議国会議員懇談会 - Nippon kaigi kokkai giin kondankai)
Conference of parliamentarians on the Shinto Association of Spiritual Leadership (神道政治連盟国会議員懇談会) - NB: SAS a.k.a. Sinseiren, Shinto Political League, Shinto Seiji Renmei Kokkai Giin Kondankai
Conference to consider the true human rights (真の人権擁護を考える懇談会)
Conference of young parliamentarians supporting the idea that the Yasukuni Shrine is a true national interest and desire for peace (平和を願い真の国益を考え靖国神社参拝を支持する若手国会議員の会)

Kaneko gave the following answers to the questionnaire submitted by Mainichi to parliamentarians in 2012:
in favor of the revision of the Constitution
in favor of right of collective self-defense (revision of Article 9)
in favor of reform of the National assembly (unicameral instead of bicameral)
in favor of reactivating nuclear power plants
against the goal of zero nuclear power by 2030s
in favor of the relocation of Marine Corps Air Station Futenma (Okinawa)
no answer regarding the evaluation of the purchase of Senkaku Islands by the Government
in favor of an effort to avoid conflict with China
against the participation of Japan to the Trans-Pacific Partnership
against a nuclear-armed Japan
against the reform of the Imperial Household that would allow women to retain their Imperial status even after marriage

References

External links 
 Official website in Japanese.

Members of the House of Representatives (Japan)
Waseda University alumni
Politicians from Kumamoto Prefecture
Living people
Members of Nippon Kaigi
1961 births
Liberal Democratic Party (Japan) politicians
21st-century Japanese politicians
Ministers of Internal Affairs of Japan